National Highway 62 (NH 62) is a  National Highway in India connecting Abohar in Punjab to Pindwara in Rajasthan.

This is the most longest highway which passes from Rajasthan crosses 7 district and 6 district headquarter of Rajasthan.

References

National highways in India